Melissa McNamara Luellen (born May 25, 1966) is the head women's golf coach for Auburn University, and a former American professional golfer who played on the LPGA Tour.

Career
McNamara was born in Tulsa, Oklahoma. She played college golf at the University of Tulsa where her mother, Dale, was the head coach and was a member of the Chi Omega fraternity. She helped her team win the 1988 NCAA Women's Division I Championship and she won the individual title. These titles were later vacated by the NCAA due to rules violations by the track and field team.

McNamara turned professional in 1988 and played on the Futures Tour and Ladies European Tour in 1988 and 1989. She joined the LPGA Tour in 1990. She won once on the LPGA Tour in 1991.

After retiring from tournament golf, McNamara became head coach of the University of Tulsa's women's golf team, replacing her mother. She coached at Tulsa for two years and then became head coach at Arizona State University in 2002. She coached the team to the 2009 NCAA championship and Azahara Muñoz to the 2008 individual NCAA title. In 2015, Luellen became the head coach of the Auburn Tigers women's golf team. She is currently in her fourth season.

Professional wins

LPGA Tour wins (1)

Other wins
1993 JCPenney Classic (with Mike Springer)

References

External links
Profile at Arizona State Sun Devils official site

American female golfers
Tulsa Golden Hurricane women's golfers
LPGA Tour golfers
Ladies European Tour golfers
Golfers from Oklahoma
Arizona State Sun Devils women's golf coaches
Auburn Tigers women's golf coaches
Female sports coaches
Sportspeople from Tulsa, Oklahoma
1966 births
Living people